Stewart Wright  (born 12 January 1974) is an English film, television and stage actor.

Wright started appearing on screen in 1997, after graduating from the Royal Central School of Speech and Drama. His breakthrough came in 1999 playing the role of Nick Levick in award-winning BBC mockumentary  series People Like Us.  Among his television credits are Black Books, Smack the Pony, Rescue Me, Wild West, Doc Martin, Bonkers, Love and Marriage and I Want My Wife Back. His film work includes Bridget Jones's Diary, Ali G Indahouse, A Good Year, Nativity 3: Dude, Where's My Donkey? and Bollywood film, Jungle Cry.

Early life

Wright was born in 1974 in Hammersmith, London, the son of two doctors. He attended Wellington College, Berkshire in the early 1990s where his passion for rugby led to his captaining the Wellington College 1st XV, going on to captain Martin Corry for Surrey Rugby Football Union Under 18s. Wright went on to complete a BA in Acting at the Royal Central School of Speech and Drama graduating in 1996. Wright relocated to Bristol in 2005, where he now lives with his family.

Career

Film and Television

Wright has played a wide variety of roles in film and TV for over twenty years, since his debut in Fierce Creatures, starring John Cleese and Jamie Lee Curtis.

His breakthrough came playing Nick Levick in the award-winning mockumentary series People Like Us in 1999. Since then he has starred in other acclaimed comedies including Black Books, Smack The Pony and Bridget Jones's Diary. He played the lead role of Eddie Chisolm alongside Sally Phillips in the BBC comedy drama Rescue Me, written by David Nicholls (writer), and starred opposite Dawn French and Catherine Tate in BBC sitcom Wild West. For two series’ he was Martin Clunes' foil, PC Mark Mylow, in the worldwide hit Doc Martin. In October 2019 his character was brought back for a one-off special. He went on to star in Love & Marriage, alongside Ashley Jensen, Alison Steadman and Celia Imrie. He has acted in a number of television dramas such as Armadillo, The Nightmare Worlds of H. G. Wells and Dirty Filthy Love, working alongside Michael Sheen, Shirley Henderson, Ray Winstone and Stephen Rea. In 2019 he worked with Steve McQueen (director) playing Mr Bains in the ‘Education’ episode of the critically acclaimed and multi award-winning series Small Axe (miniseries) for BBC/Amazon.  

Wright's film work includes British comedy classics Bridget Jones's Diary & Ali G Indahouse, as well as reuniting with Martin Clunes to star as Uncle Henry in the improvised comedy Nativity 3: Dude, Where's My Donkey? He plays a central role in Bollywood film Jungle Cry which premiered at Cannes in 2019. The film tells the real-life story of a group of Indian street kids who surprised the world in 2007 when they came to the UK and won the junior Rugby World Cup. He plays Paul Walsh, the man who inspired the team to play. Wright has gone on to become an Ambassador for Walsh's charity, the Jungle Crows Foundation.

Theatre

In 2001 Wright became recognised as a stage actor after playing Frank Lubey in the Royal National Theatre production of All My Sons, directed by the Olivier Award-winning Howard Davies (director). Since then he has maintained a theatre career alongside his screen work, playing roles varying from the Prince of Wales in The Madness of George III at the Leeds Playhouse (2003) to Bottom in A Midsummer Night's Dream at the Bristol Old Vic (2003) and Angus in Birmingham Repertory Theatre’s Neville’s Island (2005).

In 2010 he was in Tom Morris' production of Swallows & Amazons, playing “the seven-year-old Roger to hilarious comic effect.”  Originally at the Bristol Old Vic, it then transferred to the West End. Wright's roles since have included Dogberry in Much Ado About Nothing, at the Rose Theatre Kingston (2018) and the pantomime dame at the Lyric Theatre (Hammersmith) (2014). His performance of Frank in The Memory of Water at the Nottingham Playhouse was lauded by Michael Billington of The Guardian, who called it ‘beautifully played’.

Other Projects

Wright has co-written and performed in two six part radio series. His first commission for BBC Radio 4 was Strangers on Trains (2008) in which he played 28 characters. This was later repeated on BBC Radio 4 Extra. He went on to write Earls Of The Court with Perrier Award winner Will Adamsdale, which aired on Radio 4 in 2010. A hit with listeners, the pair played two Australians lost in London. The final episode was ‘Pick of the Week’ in the Radio Times. These characters were developed into a short film, Knights Of The Realm which won Best comedy/dramedy short at the LA Film Festival and Best Dramedy at the LA Shorts Fest.

In response to the Coronavirus pandemic, Wright wrote and co-created three shows in association with Tobacco Factory Theatres. 'BS3 Santa' (2020) was described as "street theatre meets travelling Santa’s grotto" and toured a mini Christmas show to people's doorsteps in Bristol. Proving to be incredibly popular, 'BS3 Santa' returns in 2021 in a different form, touring the show to entire Bristol streets rather than individual homes. In August 2021, Date Night in association with Tobacco Factory Theatres toured to people's doorsteps in Bristol, described as "a travelling, pop-up comedy performance for your doorstep, driveway or garden".

In October 2021, Wright started a podcast with two friends whom he worked alongside in the theatre industry, Adam Peck and Tom Wainwright. Of Spice and Men celebrates the joy of friendship, with the three men using the ritual of chatting over an Indian meal to navigate the perils of midlife, offering each other camaraderie, counsel, fun and a sprinkling of conflict to spice things up along the way.

Filmography

Stage

Radio

References

External links
IMDb
https://www.stewartwright.net/

English male film actors
English male television actors
English male stage actors
English male radio actors
1974 births
Living people